Ferdinand Auth (26 August 1914 – 27 December 1995) was a German politician from the Social Democratic Party of Germany. From 1962 to 1974 he was a member of the Landtag of Hesse.

References

1914 births
1995 deaths
Members of the Landtag of Hesse
Social Democratic Party of Germany politicians
Officers Crosses of the Order of Merit of the Federal Republic of Germany